The Bank of Jakin, also known as Jakin Post Office, at  135 S. Pearl St. in Jakin in Early County, Georgia, was built in 1912.  It served as the only bank in the town until 1923, then served as the town post office until 1988.  It was listed on the National Register of Historic Places in 2003.

It is a one-story brick Early Commercial style building with a flat roof.  It has a "stepped parapet roof with corbeled brick and recessed brick panels along the cornice."

References

Early Commercial architecture in the United States
Buildings and structures completed in 1912
National Register of Historic Places in Early County, Georgia
Post office buildings on the National Register of Historic Places in Georgia (U.S. state)